Kirtland High School is a public high school in Kirtland, Ohio.  It is the only high school in the Kirtland Local Schools district. It was a Blue Ribbon school in 2005.

Ohio High School Athletic Association State Championships

 Boys Track and Field – 1967 (Class A) 
 Football – 2011, 2013, 2015, 2018, 2019, 2020 
 Girls Soccer – 2020

References

External links
 District Website

High schools in Lake County, Ohio
Public high schools in Ohio
Kirtland, Ohio